The Roman Catholic Diocese of Nelson (erected 22 February 1936) is a suffragan of the Archdiocese of Vancouver.

Diocesan demographics
The diocese contains 31 parishes. Serving or retired in the diocese are 28 diocesan priests, 7 religious priests ministering to 75,000 Catholics. It also has 13 religious sisters and supports 7 Catholic schools.  (As of March 2011) This diocese covers two time zones with the East Kootenay and Columbia Valley on Mountain Time and the rest on Pacific time.

History
In the late 1830s French Canadians in the Oregon Territory petitioned the Quebec bishops to have missionary priests sent beyond the Rocky Mountains. In response to this plea, Fathers François-Norbert Blanchet and Modeste Demers were sent West to a remote part of the Quebec diocese referred to as New Caledonia by the Hudson’s Bay Company. While at Boat Encampment on the Columbia River (Mica Dam area), Blanchet and Demers celebrated Mass on October 10, 1838   the first Mass celebrated in what later became the Diocese of Nelson.

During the years of westward expansion and settlement, the spiritual needs of the region presently administered by the Diocese of Nelson came under the jurisdiction of various bishoprics:
•	Vicariate Apostolic of the Oregon Territory, 1843-1846
•	Diocese of Vancouver Island, 1846-1863
•	Vicariate Apostolic of British Columbia, 1863-1890
•	Diocese of New Westminster, 1890-1908
•	Archdiocese of Vancouver, 1908-1936

On February 22, 1936, Pope Pius XI erected the Diocese of Nelson to cover the Kootenay and Okanagan regions of southeastern British Columbia.

Bishops

Ordinaries
Martin Michael Johnson (1936–1954), appointed Coadjutor Archbishop of Vancouver, British Columbia
Thomas Joseph McCarthy (1955–1958), appointed Bishop of Saint Catharines, Ontario
Wilfrid Emmett Doyle (1958–1989)
Peter Joseph Mallon (1989–1995), appointed Archbishop of Regina, Saskatchewan
Eugene Cooney (1996–2007)
John Corriveau (2007–2018)
Gregory John Bittman (2018-present)

Other priest of this diocese who became bishop
 Bartolomeus Van Roijen, appointed Bishop of Corner Brook and Labrador, Newfoundland in 2019

Churches

Castlegar 
St. Rita's
 
Cranbrook 
St. Mary's
Christ the Servant
 
Creston
Holy Cross
 
Fernie 
Holy Family
 
Fruitvale 
St. Rita's
 
Golden 
Sacred Heart
 
Grand Forks 
Sacred Heart
 
Invermere 
Canadian Martyrs
 
Kelowna 
Immaculate Conception Church
St. Pius X
Corpus Christi 
St. Charles Garnier
 
Keremeos 
Our Lady of Lourdes
 
Kimberley 
Sacred Heart
 
Nakusp 
 Our Lady of Lourdes

 
Nelson 
 Mary Immaculate Cathedral
 
Oliver 
Christ the King
 
Osoyoos 
St. Anne's
 
Penticton 
St. Ann's
St. John Vianney's
 
Princeton 
St. Peter's
 
Revelstoke 
St. Francis of Assisi
 
Rossland
Sacred Heart
 
Sparwood 
St. Michael's
 
Summerland 
Holy Child
 
Trail 
Our Lady of Perpetual Help
St. Anthony / St. Francis Xavier
 
Westbank 
Our Lady of Lourdes
 
Winfield 
St. Edward's

Education

Catholic high schools

Catholic elementary schools

Religious institutes

Religious institutes of men
Order of St. Augustine
Missionary Oblates of Mary Immaculate
Order of Friars Minor, Capuchin
Order of the Friars Minor
MSTU Order
Order of St. Basil

Religious institutes of women
Sisters of the Atonement (SA)
Sisters of Charity of Halifax (SC)
Sisters of Charity of St. Louis (SCSL)
Daughters of Providence (FDLP)
Congregation of Notre Dame (CND)

Notes
The diocese publishes the Catholic Mountain Star newspaper.

References

External links
 

Nelson
Christian organizations established in 1936
Organizations based in British Columbia
Nelson, British Columbia
Roman Catholic dioceses and prelatures established in the 20th century